Zawojski (feminine: Zawojska; plural: Zawojscy) is a Polish surname. Notable people with the surname include:

 Agnieszka Kobus-Zawojska (born 1990), Polish rower
 Piotr Zawojski (born 1963), Polish film historian

See also
 

Polish-language surnames